The Southwest Golf Classic was a PGA Tour event played at Fairway Oaks Golf & Racquet Club in Abilene, Texas, from 1981 to 1988 (the facility was later renamed Fairway Oaks Country Club and is now a part of Abilene Country Club).  

The event had been known as the LaJet Classic when it began in 1981 and again in 1982.  In 1983, the event was known as the LaJet Coors Classic and in 1984 it was known as the LaJet Golf Classic. From 1985 to 1987 it was known as the Southwest Golf Classic. In 1988, the tournament event was hosted by Larry Gatlin & The Gatlin Brothers, and was known as the Gatlin Brothers-Southwest Golf Classic.  

In 1989, the event became a Senior PGA Tour event, and was renamed the Gatlin Brothers Southwest Senior Classic.

Tournament highlights
1981: Tom Weiskopf wins the inaugural version of the tournament. He finishes two shots ahead of Gil Morgan.
1982: Wayne Levi shoots a first round 64 on his way to a wire to wire victory by six shots over Thomas Gray. Raymond Floyd, who was engaged in a tight battle with Craig Stadler for that year's leading spot on the money list, left Abilene after shooting 146 for the first 36 holes thinking he would miss the cut. By the time Floyd learned he had not missed the cut, he had already returned to his home in Florida. Unable to make airline connections to meet his Saturday tee time, Floyd was forced to withdraw.   
1986: Future 13-time winner and 1989 Open Champion Mark Calcavecchia notches his first PGA Tour title. He finishes three shots ahead of Tom Byrum.
1988: Tom Purtzer wins the last version of the tournament. He shoots a final round 64 before defeating Mark Brooks on the first hole of a sudden death playoff.

Winners

References

External links
Tournament results (1981-1988) at GolfObserver.com

Former PGA Tour events
Golf in Texas
Sports in Abilene, Texas